Schlimia is a genus of flowering plants from the orchid family, Orchidaceae. It is native to Costa Rica and to northern South America.

Note. This genus is often incorrectly written as Schlimmia, however it honours the Belgian botanist Louis Joseph Schlim and the author later corrected the name.

As of June 2014, the following species are recognized:

Schlimia alpina Rchb.f. & Warsz. - Venezuela, Colombia, Ecuador
Schlimia condorana Dodson - Ecuador
Schlimia garayana H.R.Sweet - Ecuador
Schlimia jasminodora Planch. & Linden - Colombia, Costa Rica
Schlimia jennyana Lückel - Peru
Schlimia pandurata Schltr. - Colombia
Schlimia stevensonii Dodson - Ecuador

See also 
 List of Orchidaceae genera

References

External links 
 

Stanhopeinae genera
Stanhopeinae